The Anjouan sunbird (Cinnyris comorensis) is a species of bird in the sunbird family, Nectariniidae. It is endemic to Anjouan island in the Comoros, where its natural habitats are subtropical or tropical moist lowland forests and subtropical or tropical moist montane forests.

References

Anjouan
Anjouan sunbird
Endemic birds of the Comoros
Anjouan sunbird
Anjouan sunbird
Taxonomy articles created by Polbot